Mövenpick may refer to:
Mövenpick Hotels & Resorts
Mövenpick Ice Cream